= Sharbatly Village =

Sharbatly Village is a compound in Jeddah, Saudi Arabia. Situated on Prince Metab Street, the compound is roughly a 10-minute drive away from King Abdulaziz International Airport. It has approximately 1000 villas ranging from 1 to 6 bedrooms, all with private walled gardens. The area of the compound is approximately 500,000 m^{2}.
